Burnt by the Sun 2 (translit. Utomlyonnye solntsem 2: Predstoyanie) is a 2010 Russian drama film directed by and starring Nikita Mikhalkov. The film consists of two parts: Exodus (2010; Предстояние, literally 'Prestanding') and The Citadel (2011; Цитадель). It is the sequel to Mikhalkov's 1994 film Burnt by the Sun, set in the Eastern Front of World War II. Burnt by the Sun 2 had the largest production budget ever seen in Russian cinema ($55 mln), but it turned out to be Russia's biggest box office flop, and received negative reviews from critics both in Russia and abroad.

Plot

Exodus
The film begins in June 1941. Five years have passed since the lives and destinies of Colonel Sergei Petrovich Kotov, his wife Maroussia, their daughter Nadia, as well as those of Mitya and the Sverbitski family, were irrevocably changed: it has meant five years of incarceration for General Kotov (Nikita Mikhalkov), the former Revolutionary hero betrayed by Stalin.  He escapes certain death in the Gulag and fights on the Eastern Front as a private.

It has been five years of terror for his wife Maroussia, without the husband she believes is dead and with a daughter who has rejected her.  Nadia has spent five years in hiding, proud of her father whom she refuses to disown and whom she believes is alive, despite all reports to the contrary.

Mitya (Oleg Menshikov) survived his suicide attempt, and reluctantly continues to execute the orders of a regime he holds in contempt.  Stalin, with his nation under attack by former ally Adolf Hitler, recalls many of those whom he has had exiled to the GULAG.  He tries to mobilize the Soviet population – by any means necessary – to rise against the threat of Nazism.

Citadel

Kotov is now fighting at the front. Nadia, who has survived an attempted rape by German soldiers, is now a nurse risking her own life to save others.

Cast

Reception

The film received mostly negative reviews from both Russian and western critics. It was panned for historical inaccuracies, retconning, bad acting and other failures. It was criticized for abruptly breaking with the continuity of the first film, including mysteriously resurrecting characters presumed dead and changing their ages. For example, according to the first film, Nadia would have been 11 in 1941, but she is portrayed as an adult.

Critics panned many provocative episodes, such as a German pilot defecating on a Soviet ship, or Kotov's dipping Stalin into a cake. The Russian media reviews were especially hostile to the film, because of its revisionist portrayal of Soviet army and Soviet leaders. As web publicist Dmitry Puchkov noted, "like any other nation, Russians don't want to see their fathers portrayed as shit." Western critics were mostly negative as well. The Hollywood Reporter's Kirk Honeycutt criticized the film for "sticking too closely to the Kremlin's approved version of World War II and for its promotion of Orthodox Christianity." An American film critic likened its portrayal of the madness of World War II to the American Joseph Heller's Catch-22. According to the critic Oleg Zolotarev, "The reasons it has flopped are psychological [not artistic]. Mikhalkov is no longer seen as a director but as a state bureaucrat."

Burnt by the Sun 2: Prestanding had the highest-ever budget for a Russian film ($55 million) but made a very poor box-office showing, despite heavy promotion that included a premiere inside the Moscow Kremlin.

The film was screened at the 2010 Cannes Film Festival and was allowed to compete for awards, although it had premiered before the festival. At Cannes it received a standing ovation, but no awards.

The Russian opposition activist Valeria Novodvorskaya said that despite her complete disagreement with the political views of Mikhalkov (who expresses support towards Putin) and despite the film's being "artistically ungifted", she believed it is a good depiction of the first stages of the war against Germany. According to her, it shows how badly the Red Army was prepared for war because of Stalin's poor strategic skills.

In September 2011, the Russian Film Committee selected Burnt by the Sun 2: Citadel as the Russian nominee for the Academy Award for Best Foreign Language Film. This move was followed with protests and disagreement from many filmmakers, including another Academy Awards recipient Vladimir Menshov and Mikhalkov's brother, director Andrey Konchalovsky. The film was not included in the Oscar's short list.

See also
 List of submissions to the 84th Academy Awards for Best Foreign Language Film
 List of Russian submissions for the Academy Award for Best Foreign Language Film

References

External links
 
 

2010 films
2010 war drama films
2010 drama films
2010s historical drama films
Russian historical drama films
Russian war drama films
2010s Russian-language films
Films directed by Nikita Mikhalkov
Films about the Soviet Union in the Stalin era
Films scored by Eduard Artemyev
Films shot in the Czech Republic
Articles containing video clips
Eastern Front of World War II films
Russian sequel films
Russian World War II films
Films produced by Nikita Mikhalkov
Films with screenplays by Nikita Mikhalkov